Natalya Zasulskaya (born 28 May 1969 in Kaunas, Lithuanian SSR) is a Russian former basketball player who competed in the 1988 Summer Olympics, in the 1992 Summer Olympics, and in the 2000 Summer Olympics. She was inducted into the FIBA Hall of Fame, in 2010.

References

1969 births
Living people
Basketball players at the 1988 Summer Olympics
Basketball players at the 1992 Summer Olympics
Basketball players at the 2000 Summer Olympics
FIBA Hall of Fame inductees
Lithuanian people of Russian descent
Medalists at the 1988 Summer Olympics
Medalists at the 1992 Summer Olympics
Olympic basketball players of Russia
Olympic basketball players of the Soviet Union
Olympic basketball players of the Unified Team
Olympic bronze medalists for the Soviet Union
Olympic gold medalists for the Unified Team
Olympic medalists in basketball
Russian women's basketball players
Soviet women's basketball players
Sportspeople from Kaunas
Ros Casares Valencia players